Rhomboids can refer to: 
 Rhomboid muscles
 Rhomboid major muscle
 Rhomboid minor muscle

See also
Rhomboid